Stirling is an unincorporated community located within Long Hill Township in Morris County, New Jersey, United States. The area is served as United States Postal Service ZIP Code 07980.

The Stirling train station is located along the Gladstone Branch of the New Jersey Transit Morristown Line.

As of the 2000 United States Census, the population for ZIP Code Tabulation Area (ZCTA) 07980 was 2,499.

Demographics

History
Stirling was settled in 1740. A manufacturing and residential community was developed in the area of the railroad in the decades after the Civil War.

He named the area after William Alexander, Lord Stirling, an American Revolutionary War General who had owned  of land lying on both sides of the Passaic River.

The Assyrian National School Association was established in Stirling, New Jersey in 1899 by Assyrian immigrants from Diyarbakır, Turkey.

Education
Stirling is home to Central Middle School, which is one of the four schools in the Long Hill Township School System. Central Middle School educates students from grades 6–8.

St. Vincent de Paul School was a Catholic school in Stirling that operated under the auspices of the Roman Catholic Diocese of Paterson. The school closed in June 2016 in the wake of declining enrollment and financial challenges. The school was recognized with the Blue Ribbon School Award of Excellence in 2012.

Notable people

People who were born in, residents of, or otherwise closely associated with Stirling include:
 George Estock (1924–2010), MLB pitcher who played for the Boston Braves in 1951.

References

External links
Longhill Township History
Lord Stirling's Legacy and his grand Stirling Manor

Long Hill Township, New Jersey
Unincorporated communities in Morris County, New Jersey
Unincorporated communities in New Jersey